The fifth series of Dancing with the Stars premiered on TV One on 3 March 2009. All four judges from series 4 returned. On its opening night, over 800,000 people tuned in to watch the first show premiere. Rebecca Hobbs is sister to Christopher Hobbs. John Rowles withdrew in week three for health reasons. This series had the closest final ever experienced on the New Zealand show.

Contestants

Scorecard

Red numbers indicate the couples with the lowest score for each week.
Green numbers indicate the couples with the highest score for each week.
 indicates the couples eliminated that week.
 indicates a couple withdrew that week.
 indicates the returning couple that finished in the bottom two.
 indicates the winning couple.
 indicates the runner-up couple.

Dance Chart

 Highest Scoring Dance
 Lowest Scoring Dance

Average chart

Week 1 
Individual judges scores in the chart below (given in parentheses) are listed in this order from left to right: Brendan, Alison, Craig, Paul.

Running order

Week 2
Musical guests: 
Running order

Week 3 
Running order

Week 4
Musical guests: 
Running order

Week 5 
Musical guests:
Running order

Week 6 
Musical guests:
Running order

Week 7 
Musical guests:
Running order

Week 8
Musical guests: 
Running order

References

series 5
2009 New Zealand television seasons